Alain (Alanus) (died 1185) was a Cistercian abbot of La Rivour, and bishop of Auxerre from 1152 to 1167. He was a close associate of Bernard of Clairvaux, who was instrumental in getting him appointed bishop, under commission from Pope Eugene III, after a dispute in the diocese. Alain was one of Bernard's biographers.

He was born in Flanders, near Lille, and has often been confused with the later Alain of Lille. The book Doctrinale altum seu liber parabolarum, published c. 1485 is by the latter Alain, who died in 1203.

References
Francis Oakley (1979), The Western Church in the Later Middle Ages, pp. 389–390
The Biographical Dictionary of the Society for the Diffusion of Useful Knowledge (1842), article p. 605.

References

External links
 Biography

1185 deaths
Bishops of Auxerre
12th-century French Roman Catholic bishops
French Cistercians
Year of birth unknown